John Hunn may refer to:

 John Hunn (farmer) (1818–1894), American farmer, minister and abolitionist from Delaware, father of John Hunn (governor)
 John Hunn (governor) (1849–1926), American businessman and politician, Governor of Delaware
 Jack Hunn (1906–1997), New Zealand civil servant
 John Hunn (philanthropist), New Zealand businessman, philanthrophist and former managing director of the Todd Corporation